Leonardo Natel Vieira (born 14 March 1997), mainly known as Léo Natel, is a Brazilian professional footballer who plays as a winger for Casa Pia on loan from Corinthians.

Club career
Born in Porto Alegre, Natel started his youth career with the academy of Portuguese club Benfica. In July 2016, he was loaned out to the academy of Brazilian club São Paulo. At the end of the 2016 season, he was voted as the best player of the under-20 league. On 14 March 2017, he was called to the senior team by manager Rogério Ceni for a Copa do Brasil match against the ABC. On 27 May, he signed permanently with São Paulo for a fee of €135,000. On 4 June, he made his first team debut in a 1–0 defeat against Ponte Preta and played in the right wing position.

On 9 December 2017, Natel was loaned out to o Fortaleza for the 2018 season. On 2 May 2018, his contract with Fortaleza was terminated. At the end of the month, he moved abroad and joined Cypriot club APOEL on a season long loan deal.

Career statistics

References

External links

1997 births
Living people
Footballers from Porto Alegre
Brazilian footballers
Campeonato Brasileiro Série A players
São Paulo FC players
Fortaleza Esporte Clube players
APOEL FC players
Cypriot First Division players
Expatriate footballers in Cyprus
Brazilian expatriate footballers
Association football forwards